Tyler Moore is an International Powerlifter for Team USA and is a competitor in the Men's Open Division.  When Tyler was a teen, he was elected as Team USA's Jr Bench Press Team captain and won his first international title at the NAPF Bench Press Championships in 2011. Tyler is a member of the USAPL and competes in both, the equipped and RAW styles of Powerlifting. He is a two-time North American Bench Press Champion and holds 20 American Records. Moore became eligible for Pro competitions in the Fall of 2013 after winning his second international title.

Junior career

Moore began his powerlifting career in July 2009 at the Wisconsin Dells State Championships.  Tyler placed 2nd in the meet.

Later that year (2009), Tyler moved to Colorado and competed at the 2009 Colorado State Championships in Aurora, CO.  Tyler placed 1st overall in the Men's High School Division and broke 2 American Records.  It was at this meet he met World Champions Dan and Jennifer Gaudreau, who would later influence Tyler's training and competition level.

In 2010, Moore competed at the 2010 RAW National Championships in Denver, CO. Tyler placed 1st overall in the Men's High School Division and broke 4 American Records.

In 2010, Moore competed at the 2010 Colorado State Championships in Aurora, CO. Tyler placed 1st overall in the Men's High School Division and broke 5 American Records.

In 2011, Moore competed at the 2011 Rocky Mountain State Games in Colorado Springs, CO. This was his first International Team Qualifying Event.  Tyler placed 1st overall in the Men's Sub-Jr Division and broke 3 American Records.  He also was selected for the NAPF Bench Press Championships World Team. At this event, Moore became the first person in his division to ever break the 1000 lbs Total Record as well as the 300 lbs Bench Press Record.

In 2011, Moore competed at the 2011 Colorado State Championships in Aurora, CO. Tyler placed 1st overall in both, the Men's High School division and the Men's Open Division.

Collegiate career

In 2012, Moore competed at the 2012 Rocky Mountain State Games in Colorado Springs, CO.  Representing Colorado State University, Tyler placed first overall in the Men's Jr Division and was selected for the 2012 NAPF Bench Press Championships World Team.  Tyler fell just short of the Men's Open RAW Bench Press Record.

International career

Tyler Moore made his international debut in 2011 at the NAPF Bench Press Championships in Miami, FL. Tyler completed a Bench Press of 314.75 lbs and won 1st place for the USA over Puerto Rico which placed 2nd and 3rd respectively.

Moore was invited to compete in the 2012 NAPF Bench Press Championships in Denver, CO and was also given a position of the 2013 World Team for the World Games in Cali, Colombia. However, Tyler was unable to compete at these events as he took a hiatus in his career to follow his dream of serving in the US Air Force and attending college at Colorado State University.

After taking two years off from competition, Moore resurfaced on the World Circuit as he took home a Gold Medal at the 2013 NAPF Bench Press Championships in Miami, FL on 23 Nov, 2013. He competed in the 66 kg weight class and lifted RAW.  While he did not set any records or break his PR, Moore gave a strong showing and is now active again in powerlifting.

Records

Personal life

Tyler Moore was born in Austin, TX however, he spent most of his early life  in Pagosa Springs, CO.  Tyler is now a student at Colorado State University and is a Cadet in Air Force ROTC.

Tyler is also a recipient of the US Congressional Gold Award for honorably serving 1,100 hours of voluntary service to his community.  He was given this distinction in 2011 in Washington, D.C. by the U.S. House Congressional Award Committee.  He is one of 3 Colorado citizens to receive this award in the year 2011.

Notes

American powerlifters
Sportspeople from Austin, Texas
1993 births
People from Pagosa Springs, Colorado
Colorado State University alumni
Sportspeople from Texas
Living people